Between Men is a 1935 American Western film directed by Robert N. Bradbury who also provided the original story. Produced by A.W. Hackel's Supreme Pictures, it stars Johnny Mack Brown in his second film for the studio.

Plot
Widowed blacksmith John Wellington defends the elderly Sir George Thorne from three thugs by beating up the trio. In revenge, one of the thugs shoots Wellington's only child. Thinking his son dead, Wellington pursues and shoots down the three thugs then escapes Virginia as a fugitive wanted for murder.

Unknown to Wellington, his son survives the bullet wound. Raised as his own son by Sir George, Sir George wishes to leave his entire estate to John Wellington Junior, however young Johnny wishes to locate and return Sir George's surviving granddaughter who is somewhere in New Mexico.

Cast
 Johnny Mack Brown as Johnny Wellington Jr.
 Beth Marion as Gail Winters
 William Farnum as John Wellington/Rand
 Earl Dwire as Trent
 Lloyd Ingraham as Sir George Thorne
 Forrest Taylor as Wyndham the Lawyer

References

External links
 

1935 films
1930s action adventure films
American black-and-white films
1930s English-language films
Films directed by Robert N. Bradbury
American action adventure films
American Western (genre) films
1935 Western (genre) films
1930s American films